Tsagaannuur (white lake) is a common place name in Mongolia:

 Terkhiin Tsagaan Nuur, a lake in the Arkhangai Aimag (province)
 Dood Tsagaan nuur, a lake in the Khövsgöl Aimag
 Tsagaannuur, Khövsgöl, the sum (district) west of the lake
 two other sums in different aimags of Mongolia:
 Tsagaannuur, Bayan-Ölgii
 Tsagaannuur, Selenge

See also 
 Tsagaan (disambiguation)